Gongzhuling railway station is a railway station in Gongzhuling, Changchun, Jilin Province, China.

Railway stations in Jilin
Stations on the Beijing–Harbin Railway